Erfan Shahriari (born May 19, 2002) is an Iranian football midfielder who currently plays for Paykan in the Persian Gulf Pro League.

Club career

Paykan
He made his debut for Paykan in 28th fixtures of 2020–21 Persian Gulf Pro League against Machine Sazi while he substituted in for Mohammad Amin Darvishi.

References

Living people
2002 births
Association football midfielders
Iranian footballers
Paykan F.C. players
Persian Gulf Pro League players